The Octagon Chapel is a Unitarian Chapel located in Colegate in Norwich, Norfolk, England. The congregation is a member of the General Assembly of Unitarian and Free Christian Churches.

History

The chapel is a grade II* listed building. Completed in 1756 by the architect Thomas Ivory, it is perfectly octagonal, and a fine example of English Neo-Palladian architecture.

Originally built as a Presbyterian Chapel, the building now serves the Unitarian Community. Theophilus Browne was appointed minister in 1809, but was paid to leave the following year. William Taylor, R. H. Mottram, John Taylor and Susannah Taylor, Samuel Bourn and Harriet Martineau and Peter Finch Martineau are all associated with the Chapel. Composer Edward Taylor was organist for a while, and in 1812 published a collection of Psalm and Hymn Tunes for the chapel.

Community
Unitarians have no dogma or creed, and take inspiration from all religious teachings, as well as from science and the arts.
 
 Bring and share lunches
 Craft Group
 LGBTQ+ Coffee and cake 
 Engagement groups

Life Events
The Octagon hosts ceremonies to mark life's big transitions. Unitarians believe that everyone has the right to seek meaning. Services are not bound by tradition and all are free to express their personal truth.

Octagon Concert Series
The Octagon has a long musical heritage. It hosts the Octagon Concert Series, which, because no performer receives a fee or expenses, all money raised is donated to charity.

See also
Octagon Chapel, Liverpool
First Unitarian Church of Philadelphia

References

External links

 
 The Octagon Chapel on the Norfolk Churches website
 Unitarians in Britain
 Octagon Music Series & Octagon Singers

Octagon
Churches completed in 1756
Grade II* listed churches in Norfolk
18th-century churches in the United Kingdom
Unitarian chapels in England
Octagonal churches in the United Kingdom